AKO Fratmen were a series of sports teams in Windsor, Ontario, Canada, sponsored by the AKO Fraternity. Teams included:

Windsor AKO Fratmen Lacrosse Team of the Ontario Lacrosse Association, now Windsor Clippers
Windsor AKO Fratmen Football Team of the Canadian Junior Football League, now St. Clair Fratmen
Windsor AKO Fratmen Baseball Team

Sport in Windsor, Ontario